Edwin Michael Kosik (May 5, 1925 – June 13, 2019) was a United States district judge of the United States District Court for the Middle District of Pennsylvania.

Education and career

Kosik was born in Dupont, Pennsylvania. He received a Bachelor of Arts degree from Wilkes College in 1949. He received a Bachelor of Laws from Dickinson School of Law in 1951. He was a Corporal in the United States Army from 1943 to 1946 and a Reserve Colonel in 1975. He was in private practice in Scranton, Pennsylvania, from 1951 to 1953, became an Assistant United States Attorney of the Middle District of Pennsylvania from 1953 to 1958, before returning to private practice from 1958 to 1969. He was a Chairman of the Pennsylvania State Workmen's Compensation Board from 1964 to 1969 and became a judge of the Court of Common Pleas for the 45th Judicial District of Pennsylvania from 1969 to 1979. He became the president judge of the Court of Common Pleas of the 45th Judicial District of Pennsylvania from 1979 to 1986.

Federal judicial service

Kosik was nominated by President Ronald Reagan on May 14, 1986, to a seat vacated by Judge Malcolm A. Muir on the United States District Court for the Middle District of Pennsylvania. He was confirmed by the United States Senate on June 13, 1986, and received his commission on June 16, 1986. He assumed senior status on July 15, 1996. He was best known for imposing lengthy prison sentences on two fellow judges in a corruption case known as the "Kids for Cash scandal". Kosik moved to inactive senior status in February 2017 due to health issues at age 91, meaning that he would no longer hear cases or participate in the business of the court. A month later, he was the subject of a widely publicized missing-person search. He was found alive in a wooded area after two days. He died on June 13, 2019, aged 94.

References

External links 

1925 births
2019 deaths
Judges of the United States District Court for the Middle District of Pennsylvania
United States district court judges appointed by Ronald Reagan
20th-century American judges
United States Army colonels
People from Luzerne County, Pennsylvania
Military personnel from Pennsylvania
Wilkes University alumni
Dickinson School of Law alumni
Judges of the Pennsylvania Courts of Common Pleas
Assistant United States Attorneys
United States Army personnel of World War II